Aaadonta fuscozonata is a species of air-breathing land snail, a terrestrial pulmonate gastropod mollusc in the family Endodontidae. This species is endemic to Palau, where it is known from Koror and Peleliu, and the small islands of Ngemelis and the northern Rock Islands. This snail inhabits tropical moist lowland forest, and is threatened by the destruction and modification of its habitat.

A subspecies was identified by Alan Solem in 1976, Aaadonta fuscozonata depressa.

References

Endodontoid land snails from Pacific Islands (Mollusca : Pulmonata : Sigmurethra). Alan Solem ... ; [collab.] Barbara K. Solem. Chicago, Ill. :Field Museum of Natural History,1976.
Endodontoid land snails from Pacific Islands (Mollusca : Pulmonata : Sigmurethra). Alan Solem. Chicago :Field museum of Natural History,1982.

Endodontidae
Molluscs of Oceania
Endemic fauna of Palau
Gastropods described in 1889
Taxa named by Richard Henry Beddome